Matías Leonel Quiroga (born 25 January 1986) is an Argentine football midfielder that currently plays for Sarmiento de Resistencia.

Quiroga began his playing career in 2006 with Talleres de Córdoba. In 2009, he was signed by Newell's Old Boys but never played a first team game for the club. In 2010, he left to join Colo Colo of Chile in 2010.

References

External links
 Quiroga at Football Lineups
 

1986 births
Living people
People from San Lorenzo Department
Argentine footballers
Association football forwards
Chilean Primera División players
Talleres de Córdoba footballers
Colo-Colo footballers
Club Atlético Huracán footballers
Defensa y Justicia footballers
Club Atlético Atlanta footballers
Club Almirante Brown footballers
Sportivo Belgrano footballers
Sarmiento de Resistencia footballers
Argentine expatriate footballers
Expatriate footballers in Chile
Sportspeople from Santa Fe Province